The Duas Bocas Biological Reserve is a biological reserve in the state of Espírito Santo, Brazil.
It protects an area of Atlantic Forest, the source of a drinking water supply.

Location

The Duas Bocas Biological Reserve is in the municipality of Cariacica, Espírito Santo.
The reserve contains the Duas Bocas Dam, inaugurated by President Getúlio Vargas, which impounds the Pau Amarelo, Panela and Naia-Assú rivers.
It is part of the Duas Bocas - Mestre Álvaro Ecological Corridor.
The main activities are school visits and scientific research.

The forest coverage has suffered in the past from human activities including banana and coffee cultivation and grazing.
However, about 70% of the reserve is covered in primary Atlantic Forest.
It is home to rich and diverse wildlife, including rare and endangered species.
The cougar (Puma concolor) has been seen in the reserve.

History

The Pau Amarelo Dam was built in 1912 to distribute water to Greater Vitória.
From this date there was little human interference with the ecosystem to avoid polluting the drinking water.
The Duas Bocas Dam was built 1949–54 to accommodate population growth, and still supplies water to some of the residents of  the municipality of Cariacica.
The Duas Bocas Forest Reserve was created on 12 January 1965 to protect the area.

On 2 January 1991 the level of protection was upgraded to biological reserve, with visits allowed only by permission of the Institute of the Environment and Water Resources.
Its category was redefined through state law 4.503.
It became part of the Central Atlantic Forest Ecological Corridor, created in 2002.

Notes

Sources

Biological reserves of Brazil
Protected areas of Espírito Santo
1991 establishments in Brazil
Protected areas established in 1991